Lotisma is a genus of moths in the family Copromorphidae.

Species
Lotisma trigonana (Walsingham, 1879) (originally in Sciaphila)
Lotisma vulcanica Meyrick, 1932

References

Natural History Museum Lepidoptera generic names catalog

Copromorphidae